Lake Springfield is a  reservoir on the southeast edge of the city of Springfield, Illinois. The lake was formed in 1931–1935 by building Spaulding Dam across Sugar Creek, a tributary of the Sangamon River.

The lake was created, at a cost of $2.5 million (in 1930s dollars), as a source of water for Springfield and to provide coolant for the City Water, Light & Power coal-fired electrical generating plant. It has also served as a focus of local recreation. High-powered motor boats are allowed on much of the lake, and the lake is known for warm-water fish.

Lake Springfield can be seen from Interstate 55. The limited-access highway crosses the lake on two bridges between mileposts 88 and 89. The lake is accessible from exit 88 (East Lake Shore Drive), exit 90 (Toronto Road), and exit 94 (Stevenson Drive).

Lake Springfield is close to the campus of the University of Illinois Springfield. It also borders Abraham Lincoln Memorial Garden, a local arboretum, and the Henson Robinson Zoo. Lake Park, just north of the zoo, has preserved ruts of the Edwards Trace pioneer trail; a historical marker was posted near the trace in 2002.

Lake Springfield tributaries include Lick Creek and Sugar Creek. Water discharged from these watercourses into Lake Springfield fluctuates with the seasons and with changes in local precipitation, and City Water, Light & Power has asked for permission to build a buffer lake, Hunter Lake, nearby.

History 
CWLP constructed a new water purification plant in 1926 and immediately enlarged it a year later. Soon after, city officials realized that something had to be done to supply the growing city with more water than the Sangamon River could provide. The first proposal was to drill more wells, but it would have been too costly, and in the long run it still would not have provided enough water. That led to the only possible solution, a manmade lake.

The effort to build the lake was led by longtime city Utilities Commissioner Willis J. Spaulding. Voters approved a bond referendum in 1930 to pay for part of the lake.  Spaulding Dam is named after the commissioner, who oversaw Springfield’s electric and water departments from 1909 until 1943. In the end, however, federal relief programs such as the Works Progress Administration paid much of the lake’s $5.64 million cost. Most of those who owned land needed for the lake were willing sellers, thanks partly to the Great Depression, but not all. Leander Shoup had to be “escorted from his land by the sheriff and ten deputies,” according to a City Water, Light and Power history of the lake.

Three water sources originally were considered for construction of the lake — the Sangamon River, the South Fork of the Sangamon and the Sugar Creek Valley. Engineers determined that Sugar Creek was the most economical option.

In October 1931 CWLP hired two hundred laborers to begin clearing the land for the lake at a rate of fifty cents an hour, even though the local labor union argued that the wage should be fifty-five cents. Land was cleared from 1931 to 1935, and many miles of roadway, water mains, sewers, and power lines were laid. In addition, construction crews worked to provide the city with a public beach and beach house, six highway bridges, one railroad bridge, and two dams. Construction on the Lakeside Power Station and the Water Purification Plant also began during that period. By December 1933 the lake was ready to begin taking on water from Sugar Creek and its tributary, Lick Creek. It was estimated that it would take approximately seven months to fill the 4,300-acre Lake Springfield, but due to a severe drought, it took eighteen months. Water first ran over the dam spillway at 12:30 a.m. on May 2, 1935. At it fullest point, it contained 21.4 billion gallons of water, covered 4,260 acres, and was a sufficient supply of water for a city with a population of 300,000. At that point, the majority of the construction was complete. All that remained was that of the completion of the Lakeside Power Station, which was finished in March 1936, and the Water Purification Plant, which was finished in October 1936.

One of the most noteworthy aspects of Lake Springfield is its creation in the midst of the Great Depression. The jobless rate in Springfield was at an unprecedented high. Labor gangs were organized to assist the building process, and federal programs, such as the Civilian Conservation Corps and the Works Progress Administration, provided millions of dollars to cover lake construction costs and laborers' salaries. President Herbert Hoover pointed out that it was an excellent time to construct public improvements to provide employment and bring the prosperity of the country to a higher level. The Lake Springfield project brought into the city $2.5 million in capital, and $1 million of that went directly to local Springfield labor.

The lake has undergone both drought and flood over the past 80 years. The worst drought, which lasted from 1952 to 1955, drew the lake down 12.5 feet below full pool, reducing its water storage to 7.4 billion gallons and threatening operations of both the power plant complex and the water treatment plant. That prompted construction of an emergency connection to the South Fork to supplement the lake.

The 1950s drought also led to plans to build a second lake as a long-term backup water source. Nearly all the land for Lake II (later named Hunter Lake, after former utilities commissioner John Hunter) had been purchased by the early 21st century. However, bureaucratic hurdles and continuing public doubt about the need for the new lake left it unbuilt as of 2022.

Fishing
Lake Springfield is a highly ranked fishing lake. Species that are doing well, as of 2016, include:

Other fish found in the lake include blue catfish, black crappie, green sunfish, green sunfish x bluegill hybrid, freshwater drum, redear sunfish, carp, walleye, saugeye, black bullhead and yellow bullhead.

Recreation

Boating 
Recreational boating is popular on Lake Springfield, especially in the summer months.  Some activities include skiing, wakeboarding, windsurfing, sailing, tubing, kayaking, paddle boarding. There are coves located around the lake where boaters are allowed to tie up away from the main boating areas. A private Marina located at the south end of the lake provides boat rentals, kayak rentals, a restaurant, and other various boating amenities.

Parks 
There are numerous parks located around Lake Springfield. Most parks have pavilions that are available to the public, and many have docks with fishing access. Lincoln Memorial Gardens is located on the east side of the lake, and offers trails and other exhibits. The public beach closed in the 2000’s and never re-opened. The historic Beach House building located on the beach is still available to rent by reservation.

Events 
There are fish fries, slo-pitch softball tournaments, and other various activities that take place at the clubs located on Lake Springfield. There is an annual triathlon that takes place during the summer months.  There have been boat races during various stretches since the 1980's.  The last boat races on the lake were in 2019. There is a large firework show located on the south end of the lake every year around 4th of July. There is another firework show on Labor Day Weekend that happens on the north end of the lake.

References

External links
 
 Depression-Era History of Lake Springfield

Further reading
 Robert Mazrim and Curtis Mann, Lake Springfield in Illinois: Public Works and Community Design in the Mid-Twentieth Century (Mount Pleasant, S.C.; America Though Time/Arcadia, 2021).  A pictorial history of Lake Springfield.

Bodies of water of Sangamon County, Illinois
Protected areas of Sangamon County, Illinois
Springfield
Springfield, Illinois
1935 establishments in Illinois